was a Japanese photographer active from 1935 to 1999. In particular, Hamaya was known for his photographs of rural Japan.

Biography
Hamaya was born in Shitaya, Tokyo, on 28 March 1915. Between 1942 and 1945 he contributed to Front, the propaganda photo journal of the Tōhō-sha company.

Recognition
By 1955 one of Hiroshi Hamaya's photographs, a high-angle view of kimono-clad springtime dancers led by his wife, was included by curator Edward Steichen in the world-touring Museum of Modern Art exhibition The Family of Man that was seen by more than 9 million visitors.

In 1956, Hamaya published his acclaimed photobook "Snow Country" (Yukiguni) featuring photographs of Japan's frigid northeastern Tōhoku region in winter.

In 1960, Hamaya took part in the massive Anpo protests against revision of the U.S.-Japan Security Treaty, and published a book of his photographs of the protesters titled "A Record of Anger and Sadness" (Ikari to kanashimi no kiroku), reflecting Hamaya's disappointment that the protests failed to stop the treaty.

Hamaya was the first Japanese photographer to join Magnum Photos: in 1960, as an associate member. He received the Master of Photography Award from the International Center of Photography (New York) in 1986.

Hamaya died on 6 March 1999.

Published collections of Hamaya's works

Publications dedicated to Hamaya's works 

Senkō shashinjutsu. Ars Shashin Bunko. Tokyo: Ars, 1941. A handbook on flash photography.
Yukiguni: Hamaya Hiroshi shashinshū: Kamera Mainichi bessatsu. Tokyo: Mainichi Shinbunsha, 1956. Photographs of Japan's "snow country", the northeast coast of Honshū. Published in conjunction with Camera Mainichi.
Ura Nihon: Hamaya Hiroshi shashinshū / Japan's Back Coast. Tokyo: Shinchōsha, 1957. The title means "back-country Japan".
Henkyō no machi / Urumchi. Sekai Shashinka Shirīzu. Tokyo: Heibonsha, 1957. Photographs of Ürümqi.
Mite kita Chūgoku / The China I Have Seen. Tokyo: Kawade Shobō Shinsha, 1958. A separate booklet contains an English translation.
Shi no furusato. Tokyo: Chūōkōronsha, 1958.
Hamaya Hiroshi shashinshū. Gendai Nihon shashin zenshū. Tokyo: Sōgensha, 1958. Number 3 in a set of nine booklets of Japanese photography, the only other photographers having entire booklets devoted to their work being Ihei Kimura and Ken Domon.
Kodomo fūdoki / Children in Japan. Tokyo: Chūōkōronsha, 1959. Photographs of children in Japan.
Ikari to kanashimi no kiroku. Tokyo: Kawade Shobō Shinsha, 1960.
Nihon rettō / Landscapes of Japan. Tokyo: Heibonsha, 1964.
Eye: Hiroshi Hamaya photographs. Ōiso, Kanagawa: Hamaya Hiroshi, 1968.
American America. Tokyo: Kawade Shobō Shinsha, 1971.
Hamaya Hiroshi-shū. Chikuma Foto Gyararī. Tokyo: Chikuma Shobō, 1971.
Senzō zanzō: Shashinka no taikenteki kaisō. Tokyo: Kawade Shobō Shinsha, 1971.
Nihon no shika: Shashinshū. Tokyo: Chūōkōronsha, 1972.
Aizu Yaichi. Ōiso, Kanagawa: Hamaya Hiroshi, 1972. A portfolio about the poet and art historian Aizu Yaichi.
Nihon no shizen Landscape of Japan. 2 vols. Tokyo: Kokusai-jōhō-sha, 1975.
Yukiguni. Sonorama Shashin Sensho 1. Tokyo: Asahi Sonorama, 1977.
Kohō Fuji. Nihon no bi. Tokyo: Shūeisha, 1978.
Nankyoku hantō natsu-keshiki / Summer Shots: Antarctic Peninsula. Tokyo: Asahi Sonorama, 1979.
Hamaya Hiroshi shashinshū-sei-ten: 1930–1981. Tokyo: PPS Tsūshinsha, 1981.
Chi no kao. Hamaya Hiroshi shashinshū-sei 1. Tokyo: Iwanami shoten, 1981. Title means "Aspects of nature".
Sei no kao. Hamaya Hiroshi shashinshū-sei 2. Tokyo: Iwanami shoten, 1981.
Landscapes. New York: Abrams 1982. . English-language version of Chi no kao (1981).
Tabi: Shashinshū. Tokyo: Nihon Kōtsū-kōsha, 1982.
Hiroshi Hamaya. I Grandi Fotografi. [Milano]: Gruppo Editoriale Fabbri, [1982].
Gakugei shoka / Gakugei Shoka. Tokyo: Iwanami, 1983. 2nd ed. Tokyo: Iwanami, 1991. . Black and white portraits of writers and other people in the arts, 1937–82. Texts in Japanese, captions in Japanese and English.
Hiroshi Hamaya. Los Grandes Fotografos. Barcelona: Ediciones Orbis, 1984.
Nyonin rekijitsu: Hamaya Asa tsuitō shashinchō / Calendar days of Asaya Hamaya, 1948–1950. Ōiso, Kanagawa: Hamaya Hiroshi, 1985. A portfolio of photographs of Hamaya's wife taken 1948–1950, issued as a memorial to her after her death.
Shōwa nyoninshū: Shashinshū / Women in the Showa Era. Tokyo: Mainichi Shinbun-sha, 1985.
Hamaya Hiroshi ten: ICP masutā-obu-fotogurafī-shō jushō kinen / Hiroshi Hamaya: Fifty-Five Years of Photography. Tokyo: PPS Tsūshinsha, 1986.
Emergence de la terre. Neuilly: Éditions Hologramme, 1986. With a preface by Marc Riboud.
Shōwa dansei shokun: Shashinshū. Tokyo: Asahi Shinbun-sha, 1989. .
Hamaya Hiroshi: Shashin taiken 60 nen. Hiratsuka, Kanagawa: Hiratsuka Museum of Art, 1991. Catalogue of an exhibition held at the Hiratsuka Museum of Art.
Senzō zanzō: Shashin taiken 60 nen. Tokyo: Chikuma Shobō, 1991. .
Shashinshū watakushi. Ōiso, Kanagawa: Shōnan Bunko, 1991. 
Shashin no seiki: Hamaya Hiroshi shashin taiken roku-jū-roku-nen. Tokyo: Tokyo Metropolitan Museum of Photography, 1997.  Catalogue of an exhibition of 66 years' work by Hamaya held at the Tokyo Metropolitan Museum of Photography.
Fukuen zuisho no hitobito. Tokyo: Sōjunsha, 1998. . Black and white portraits of writers and other people in the arts. Texts and captions in Japanese.
Ichi no oto: 1930-nendai Tōkyō: Hamaya Hiroshi sakuhinshū. Tokyo: Kawade Shobō Shinsha, 2009. . Photographs of Tokyo in the 1930s.
Ichi no oto: Machi no sazanuki: 1930-nendai Tōkyō: Hamaya Hiroshi sakuhinten. JCII Photo Salon Library 238. Tokyo: JCII, 2011.  Booklet accompanying an exhibition of photographs of Tokyo in the 1930s.

Other publications with major contributions by Hamaya 

Det Gömda Japan. Stockholm, Bonnier, 1960. Text by Bo Setterlind.
Cornell Capa, ed. The Concerned Photographer 2. New York: Grossman, 1972.  (hardback),  (paperback). Photographs by Hamaya, Cornell Capa, Marc Riboud, Roman Vishniac, Bruce Davidson, Gordon Parks, Ernst Haas, Donald McCullin, and W. Eugene Smith.
Shiga Prefecture. Ōtsu, Shiga: Shiga Prefectural Government, 1984. Hamaya contributes the photographs; the text is by various writers.
Die Präfektur Shiga. Ōtsu, Shiga: Regierung der Präfektur Shiga, 1984.
Modan Tōkyō rapusodi / Rhapsody of Modern Tokyo. Tokyo: Tokyo Metropolitan Museum of Photography, 1993.  Catalogue of an exhibition of prewar street photography by Hamaya, Kineo Kuwabara, Kōji Morooka, Masao Horino and Yoshio Watanabe held at the Tokyo Metropolitan Museum of Photography.
Judith Keller and Amanda Maddox, eds. Japan's Modern Divide: The Photographs of Hiroshi Hamaya and Kansuke Yamamoto. Los Angeles: J. Paul Getty Museum, 2013. . Catalogue of an exhibition of the work of Hamaya and Kansuke Yamamoto.

Notes

References

External links
 John Clark, "Hamaya Hiroshi (1915–1999) and Photographic Modernism in Japan", Vol. 7, Issue 1, Self and Nation, Fall 2016.

Japanese photographers
Portrait photographers
Street photographers
Writers on photographic techniques
1915 births
1999 deaths
Photography in China
20th-century Japanese artists
20th-century Japanese male artists